State Highway 329 (SH 329) is a state highway that runs from Grandfalls in southwestern Texas east and southeast to Rankin.

History
The route was originally designated on April 15, 1940 as the part of the highway from Grandfalls to Crane. An extension to Rankin was signed, but not designated on May 21, 1953 along Farm to Market Road 870 (FM 870). On August 29, 1990, the extension was officially designated, and FM 870 was cancelled.

FM 870 was designated on October 29, 1948 from US 67 in Rankin northwest 8.8 miles to a road intersection. On May 23, 1951, FM 870 was extended northwest 8.8 miles. On December 18, 1951, FM 870 was extended 14.3 miles to SH 51 (now US 385). In 1990, FM 870 was cancelled.

Route description
Beginning at a junction with SH 18 at Grandfalls in Ward County, SH 329 runs east to a junction with US 385 at Crane in Crane County. In Grandfalls the highway is known as 1st Street; in Crane it is known as 6th Street. SH 329 then continues east and southeast to its final junction with US 67 at Rankin in Upton County. Most of the terrain covered by SH 329 is sparsely populated ranch and oil country.

Junction list

References

External links
Texas official travel map at the Texas Department of Transportation (Adobe Acrobat format, magnification required for legibility)
Satellite image of junction of SH 329 with US 385 at Google Maps

Transportation in Ward County, Texas
Transportation in Crane County, Texas
Transportation in Upton County, Texas
329